ŽNK Ombla is a Croatian women's association football club based in Dubrovnik. The club was founded in 1999 and they currently compete in the Croatian First Division.

References

Women's football clubs in Croatia
Football clubs in Dubrovnik-Neretva County
Association football clubs established in 1999
1999 establishments in Croatia